Princess Sofia may refer to:

Sofia Balthazar, protagonist of the Disney Junior series Sofia the First
Princess Sofia, Duchess of Värmland, a member of the Swedish royal family
Infanta Sofia of Spain